Picton Road is a  rural road that links Picton and Wollongong through the Macarthur region of New South Wales. It provides an important link between the Hume and Princes Motorways.

Route
Picton Road starts with from the intersection with Old Hume Highway (Remembrance Drive) in Picton, then heads in a south-easterly direction, rossing the Nepean River and then Hume Motorway and continues over grass-forested ranges east of Wilton (passing through Sydney Water Catchment areas) until it ends at the intersection with Mount Ousley Road (Princes Motorway) in the southern fringes of Cataract.

History
The passing of the Main Roads Act of 1924 through the Parliament of New South Wales provided for the declaration of Main Roads, roads partially funded by the State government through the Main Roads Board (later the Department of Main Roads, and eventually Transport for NSW). Main Road No. 179 was declared on 8 August 1928 from Campbelltown via Maldon and Wiltin to Appin. With the passing of the Main Roads (Amendment) Act of 1929 to provide for additional declarations of State Highways and Trunk Roads, this was amended to Main Road 179 on 8 April 1929. A branch of Main Road 179 was extended from Maldon to the intersection with Hume Highway in Picton on 14 December 1938. Main Road 502 was declared on 16 August 1939, from the intersection with Main Road 179 near Wilton to Mount Keira.

Trunk Road 95 was declared on 27 May 1970, from the intersection with Hume Highway in Picton via Maldon, Wilton and Mount Ousley to the intersection with Princes Highway in  North Wollongong, subsuming Main Road 502 and the alignment of Main Road 179 between Picton and Wilton; as a result Main Road 179 was truncated at Menangle. The western end of Trunk Road 95 was truncated the interchange with South-Western Freeway (today Hume Motorway) on 24 October 1984; the eastern end of Main Road 612 was extended along the former alignment from the freeway interchange to Picton (and continuing west via Mowbray Park to Oakdale).

The passing of the Roads Act of 1993 updated road classifications and the way they could be declared within New South Wales. Under this act, the western end of Main Road 612 was truncated to end at Picton on 27 November 2009; Main Road 468 was declared along its former alignment from Picton to Mowbray Park. Picton Road today, as part of Main Roads 95 and 612, still retains these declarations.

Picton Road was signed State Route 88 across its entire length, with State Route 56 concurrent from Picton to Menangle, in 1974. With the conversion to the newer alphanumeric system in 2013, this was replaced with route B88 from the interchange with Hume Motorway to the interchange with Princes Motorway (with the rest of the road to Picton left unallocated).

Major intersections

See also

 Appin Road
 List of New South Wales highways
 List of Australian highways

References

Highways in New South Wales
Wollongong